Persisum Sumbawa (full name: Persatuan Sepakbola Indonesia Sumbawa (English: Football Association of Indonesia Sumbawa). Persisum Sumbawa is an Indonesian football club based in Sumbawa Regency, Sumbawa, West Nusa Tenggara. They currently compete in the Liga 3 and their homeground is Pragas Stadium.

References

External links
Liga-Indonesia.co.id

Football clubs in Indonesia
Football clubs in West Nusa Tenggara
Sumbawa